Moray Charles Livingstone Macpherson (4 November 1959 – 5 February 2016) was an English first-class cricketer.
 
The son of Rorie and Shelagh Macpherson, he was born at Barton on Sea, Hampshire. He was educated firstly at Horris Hill School, before attending Winchester College. From Winchester he went up to Lincoln College, Oxford where he played first-class cricket for Oxford University on five occasions in 1980. Playing as a wicket-keeper, he scored a total of 55 runs in his five matches, with a high score of 22. Behind the stumps he took eight catches and made a single stumping. He died in February 2016 at the Michael Sobell Hospice in Northwood, following a battle with cancer. His uncle, Hubert Webb, was also a first-class cricketer.

References

External links

1959 births
2016 deaths
People from New Forest District
People educated at Winchester College
Alumni of Lincoln College, Oxford
English cricketers
Oxford University cricketers
Deaths from cancer in England